Craig M. Boise (born 1963) is an American legal scholar who is currently the Dean of Syracuse University College of Law. He previously served as Dean of Cleveland–Marshall College of Law.

Early life and education
Boise was born in 1963 to a white mother and black father and was placed at a children's home in Kansas City, Missouri. He was adopted by a white farming family and grew up in a small all-white farming community in the Kansas city area.

Boise had set out to be a farmer, but he became very good at piano and ended up getting a music scholarship to the University of Missouri–Kansas City.
After two years there, he left college to sign up to be a cop for the Kansas City Police Department, where he worked for the department for five years from 1986 to 1991. He also had a stint on the SWAT team. During this job, he grew interested in constitutional law cases and decided to go to law school.

While Boise started college to be a concert pianist, he graduated in 1991 with a B.A. summa cum laude degree in political science. He had also completed coursework in piano performance at the university's music conservatory. In 1994, he obtained a J.D. from the University of Chicago Law School. At Chicago, he took a labor law class with Associate Justice of the Supreme Court of the United States Elena Kagan.

In 1999, he completed an LL.M. in tax law from the New York University School of Law.

Career
After graduating from law school, Boise worked as a law clerk to Judge Pasco Bowman II on the U.S. Court of Appeals for the Eighth Circuit. Between 1995 and 1997, Boise worked as an associate at Husch & Eppenberger, LLC, before working in the tax practice groups of Cleary Gottlieb Steen & Hamilton LLP, Akin Gump Strauss Hauer & Feld and Thompson Hine LLP (Cleveland) between 1997 and 2003.

Academic career
Boise has taught various tax law courses and published on U.S. Corporate tax, International taxation, and offshore financial centers.

In 2003, Boise was a visiting professor at Washington and Lee University School of Law. He joined the faculty of Case Western Reserve University School of Law, where he worked as an associate professor between 2003 and 2009. In 2009, he joined the faculty of DePaul University College of Law as a professor and a director of its graduate tax program.

In 2011, Boise served as a Joseph C. Hostetler–BakerHostetler Chair in Law at Cleveland–Marshall College of Law and became the 14th Dean of the college and the law school’s first African-American dean.

In 2016, Boise was appointed as the 12th Dean of Syracuse University College of Law and its first African-American law school dean. He replaced Hannah Arterian who stepped down as the Dean after 13 years.

At Syracuse, he focused on providing leadership on navigating the disruptions occurring in legal services and in online legal education, increasing diversity, bar-pass rate, & revenues, and taught tax law. He established the first online joint JD/MBA program, one of the nation’s top two largest hybrid online JD programs, Masters of Legal Studies programs for non-lawyers. In 2017, he was criticized for attempting to terminate the 'Cold Case Justice Initiative' at SU.

Other work
Boise has been admitted to Ohio, New York, and Missouri bar.

In 2018, Boise was co-chair on incoming Attorney General of New York Letitia James's five-person transition team.

In 2021, he was listed among the 50 power players in the Western New York legal community by the NY Daily Record.

Personal life
Boise is married to Marina Boise and the couple has 4 children. He is an avid sailor and enjoys sailing with family in the Caribbean. He has been described as the ‘most interesting man in the world’ by The Daily Orange for his collection of talents that include being a skilled classical pianist, scuba diver, sailor, motorcyclist, corporate international tax law guru, salsa dancer, world traveler and a former SWAT team member. Cleveland State University's Viking Pride Alumni Newsletter said "Craig Boise is possibly the only Harley-riding, piano-playing, calf-roping law dean in the country".

References

External links

Boise talks to the ABA Law Student Podcast in 2020 about Syracuse Law's JDinteractive (JDi) degree
Boise talks to the 'Sound of Ideas' program of Ideastream Public Media in 2011 about new wave of lawyers

20th-century American lawyers
21st-century American lawyers
Deans of law schools in the United States
African-American legal scholars
African-American lawyers
Washington and Lee University faculty
Case Western Reserve University faculty
DePaul University faculty
Cleveland State University faculty
Syracuse University faculty
Tax lawyers
Law clerks
People associated with Cleary Gottlieb Steen & Hamilton
Lawyers from Cleveland
Lawyers from New York City
Lawyers from Kansas City, Missouri
University of Missouri–Kansas City alumni
University of Chicago Law School alumni
New York University School of Law alumni
American police officers
1963 births
Living people